Rhodesiana is any artifact, or collection of artifacts, which is related to the history, geography, folklore and cultural heritage of Rhodesia, the name used before 1980 to refer to modern Zimbabwe (and, before 1964, contemporary Zambia as well). Many objects, both physical and immaterial, can be defined as "Rhodesiana"; a painting of a Rhodesian landscape, for example, could be considered as such, as might a song by a Rhodesian artist, or a tale or personality from the country's history. The things involved need not be old, but need to possess relevant associations with Rhodesia; for Rhodesian people and their descendants, a piece of Rhodesiana will commonly arouse feelings of patriotism and nostalgia.

Rhodesiana journal

The Rhodesia Africana Society used the term as the title of its historical and cultural journal Rhodesiana, which was first published in 1956. It renamed itself The Rhodesiana Society in 1958, and published 40 issues of the Rhodesiana journal before ceasing its publication in 1979. After Rhodesia became Zimbabwe a year later, the society renamed itself the Historical Society of Zimbabwe, and began publishing Heritage (later Heritage of Zimbabwe), a similar journal to Rhodesiana, in 1981.

Rhodesiana market
The term "Rhodesiana" may be used to describe the theme of a museum or collection, or to summarise the character of goods for sale. Indeed, a London-based dealer of African memorabilia, David Saffery, reported in 2002 that Rhodesiana was one of his best-selling lines, with the majority of customers being expatriates, "most of whom still describe themselves as Rhodesians". Particularly popular items included civil and military flags, banknotes of the Rhodesian pound and dollar, stamps, documents and medals. Since 1980, Zimbabwean embassies and high commissions around the world have at various times raised money by selling off obsolete Rhodesian passports, documents, tableware, furniture and various curios. The Zimbabwean government itself entered the Rhodesiana market in 2002, when it sold off 9,000 unclaimed Rhodesian General Service Medals.

See also 
 Ethos
 Culture of Zimbabwe
 Americana – a similar concept in the United States
 Australiana – a similar concept in Australia
 Canadiana – a similar concept in Canada
 Kiwiana – a similar concept in New Zealand
 Yugo-nostalgia - a similar concept in the former Yugoslav states

References

Rhodesian culture